Richard Whitman may refer to:

 Richard G. Whitman, academic, think tank member and media commentator
 Richard Ray Whitman (born 1949), Yuchi-Muscogee Creek artist

See also
 Dick Whitman, American baseball player